Frick may refer to:

 Frick, Aargau, a municipality in Switzerland
 Henry Clay Frick
 Frick (surname)
 Frick of Frick and Frack, ice skating comedy duo
 A minced oath of "fuck"

See also
 Frick Park, a major park in Pittsburgh
 Frick Art & Historical Center, a Pittsburgh museum
 Frick Fine Arts Building, University of Pittsburgh
 Frick Building, a skyscraper in Pittsburgh
 Frick Collection, New York City museum
 Frick Art Reference Library, a research institution affiliated with the Frick Collection